Dayana Erika Iohanna Sánchez (born 28 August 1992) is an Argentine boxer. She represented Argentina at the 2020 Summer Olympics in Tokyo.

She competed at the 2019 Pan American Games, winning a silver medal.

References

1992 births
Living people
Argentine women boxers
Boxers at the 2019 Pan American Games
Pan American Games silver medalists for  Argentina
Pan American Games medalists in boxing
Medalists at the 2019 Pan American Games
Boxers at the 2020 Summer Olympics
Olympic boxers of Argentina
Sportspeople from Córdoba, Argentina

External links 

 Dayana Sanchez BoxRec